Nederlandse Spoorwegen (NS;) is the principal passenger railway operator in the Netherlands. It is a Dutch state-owned company founded in 1938. The Dutch rail network is one of the busiest in the European Union, and the third busiest in the world after Switzerland and Japan.

The rail infrastructure is maintained by network manager ProRail, which was split off from NS in 2003. Freight services, formerly operated by NS Cargo, merged with DB Schenker in 2000. NS runs 4,800 scheduled domestic trains a day, serving 1.1 million passengers. The NS also provides international rail services from the Netherlands to other European destinations and carries out concessions on some foreign rail markets through its subsidiary Abellio.

History

Early years

World War I caused an economic downturn in the Netherlands that caused the two largest Dutch railway companies, Hollandsche IJzeren Spoorweg-Maatschappij (HSM) and Maatschappij tot Exploitatie van Staatsspoorwegen (SS), to become unprofitable. The companies avoided bankruptcy by integrating their operations, which occurred by 1917. The cooperation was by economic and ideological reasons. The state provided support by buying shares in both companies. In 1938, the state bought the remaining shares and merged the companies to create NS; NS was not nationalised.

During World War II, NS was forced by the Germans to construct railways to Westerbork transit camp and transport almost a hundred thousand Jews to extermination camps. The company's only wartime strike was during the Dutch famine of 1944–45; NS opted not to strike a year earlier.

NS played a pivotal role in the post-war reconstruction of the Netherlands; only it could provide the required logistical services in a time when there was little alternative to rail transport. The company declined in the 1960s - like many other railways - and operated at a loss. There was increased competition from other modes of transport. In addition, national coal distribution from Limburg became less profitable; the discovery of a gas field near Slochteren led to coal losing market share to natural gas in power plants and homes. NS' response, the Spoorslag '70 plan which increased service and introduced intercity service, failed to restore profitability. The company was deemed nationally important and received state subsidies.

Reforms and reversal

NS was reorganized following the neoliberal reforms of the 1980s and the 1991 EU Directive 91/440; the latter required railway infrastructure and transport activities to be managed independently. Although the state called the process "corporatization" (verzelfstandiging), it really only meant the withdrawal of subsidies. The changes were carried out by Rob den Besten, who became chief executive officer of NS after the retirement of Leo Ploeger.

NS' infrastructure division was split off into NS Railinfratrust. Plans to split the remainder of NS met with limited success due to trade union opposition; the new companies created were NS Reizigers , locomotive maintenance company NedTrain. Passenger transport was to be conducted on a commercial basis, but the state continued to subsidize non-viable routes. Internally, route managers assumed de facto control,  The freight business, NS Cargo, merged with Deutsche Bahn; the resulting company operated as Railion in 2000 and then as DB Cargo. Performance deteriorated after the reforms, and the company suffered multiple unorganized strikes. The entire board of directors resigned in late-2001.

Another change in strategy followed. Karel Noordzij became CEO in 2002 and reversed many of the reforms to restore confidence in the company. The state no longer considered competitive passenger service to be viable, and began granting concessions with the goal of one concession per line. NS received a concession to run main line routes until 2025.

Recent years

The timetable change on 10 December 2006 saw the most routes to approximate the symmetry time in clock-face schedules to the one used in most other European countries. Previously, this was different at the minute (46 seconds) and led to problems with cross-border trains.  the company's CEO is former minister Wouter Koolmees, after Marjan Rintel left to become CEO of KLM.

NS was heavily impacted by the COVID-19 pandemic, which caused massive drops in passenger numbers. The company received significant financial support from the national government in order to keep the company solvent. In 2022, the company made significant cuts in its timetable, running fewer and shorter trains, as a consequence of personnel shortages.

Controversies 
NS has been involved in various controversies.
 Technical problems with the high-speed V250 trains, which started their services on 29 July 2013, and ended on 17 January 2014, led to the resignation of CEO Bert Meerstadt in June 2016 and a parliamentary investigation in 2016. The High Speed Alliance (HSA), an NS (80%) / KLM (20%) joint venture almost went bankrupt due to the late introduction of the trains in combination with a too high price for the concession which the company paid to the Dutch government. HSA was liquidated in 2017.
 In 2013, it was revealed that NS had been using a subsidiary in Ireland, NS Financial Services Company (NSFSC), to reduce its tax liability in the Netherlands. The procedure was determined to be lawful, but it was unfavorable for the Dutch taxpayers for a state-owned company to avoid national taxes. From 1998 the NS used the favourable tax climate in Ireland, which resulted in a profit for NS of more than €270 million but a loss to the Dutch state of €21 million in 2012 alone. The corporate tax rate in Ireland was 12.5%, in the Netherlands 25% at that time. NS used its Irish subsidiary to buy new trains, among others the high-speed V250 trains from the Italian firm AnsaldoBreda. The Dutch Minister of Finance, Jeroen Dijsselbloem, wrote to the parliament that NS would stop this tax evasion. Most rolling stock was transferred to the Netherlands-based NS Lease in December 2017. NSFSC was wound up in April 2019.
 In 2015 it became clear that a subsidiary of NS, Abellio, had shown unfair behaviour about a tendering for public transport in the province of Limburg. The company had obtained confidential information from a competitor, Veolia, through a former employee of Veolia who had been hired by Abellio subsidiary Qbuzz. On 5 June 2015, it became clear that CEO Timo Huges of the NS had given incomplete and incorrect information about the tendering procedure. According to Minister Dijsselbloem, Huges had acted "sloppy, inaccurate and in violation of the law." Consequently, Huges resigned from his position.

Coverage 

The NS covers most of the country, with almost all cities connected, mostly with a service frequency of two trains an hour or more and at least four trains per hour between all of the largest five cities (Amsterdam, Rotterdam, The Hague, Utrecht and Eindhoven) as well as some smaller cities (Nijmegen, Amersfoort, Arnhem, 's-Hertogenbosch, Dordrecht and Leiden). From December 2008 train frequencies were increased on the following services: Arnhem–Nijmegen (8 trains per hour) and The Hague–Rotterdam (12 trains per hour), Amsterdam Centraal–Hoofddorp (16 trains per hour). A night train service was added between Utrecht, Gouda and Rotterdam. Trains usually run between 5:00 a.m. and 1:00 a.m. although there is also a nightline which connects major cities in the Randstad throughout the night, as well as in weekends also some major cities in North Brabant.

In addition to its domestic services, NS is also a partner (along with Stena Line and its British railway company Abellio Greater Anglia) in the Dutchflyer service. NS has also entered into a partnership with KLM to operate services on the new HSL-Zuid under the name Intercity Direct towards Breda and Brussels. Intercity Direct is part of NS International; other services such as Thalys to France and Intercity-Express to Germany and Switzerland are also part of NS International.

Rail network

The hoofdrailnet is the official core internal passenger rail network of the Netherlands. Currently, NS has a concession until 1 January 2015 to provide all passenger services on this network, except that on some stretches there is an overlap with lines for which other operators have a concession. Some of the most notable of these stretches are those from Elst railway station to Arnhem Centraal railway station, where NS shares tracks with Arriva, and further on to Arnhem Velperpoort. Here the tracks are shared by three operators, as Breng, ultimately part of Transdev, operates there in addition to the two previously mentioned operators. Officially the overlaps do not constitute competition on the same lines.

The concession was free of charge until 2009, and costs an increasing amount since then, up to €30 million for the year 2014. The concession distinguishes the main stations and other stations. Except on New Year's Eve, the main stations have to be served at least twice an hour per direction from 6 a.m. to midnight and the other stations at least once an hour. Exceptions are possible until the start of the next concession.

The next concession period is 2025–2035. For the 2015–2025 concession, requirements include: for every train service where on average more than one-third of the passengers travel longer than 30 minutes, a train with a toilet is used, every newly ordered train has a toilet and in 2025 every train has to have a toilet. Currently trains on the hoofdrailnet without a toilet include the NS SGMm numbers 2111 to 2125, the so-called classical "Sprinter" and the Sprinter Lighttrain (SLT, these trains are being converted periodically to have a toilet on board).

Types of train service  
NS provides three kinds of train service:
 A Sprinter stops at all stations, and is mainly used for local traffic. On some smaller lines, though, it is the only kind of service. The name is derived from the 'Sprinter' (2900 class) rolling stock; however, the service was sometimes operated using older style rolling stock (such as 'Plan V/T': 400, 500, 800, and 900 class).
 Intercity services only stop at larger stations and were introduced in the 1970s to provide fast train connections throughout the country. Intercity services are operated by DDZ, VIRM and ICM class trains. An exception is the service between Den Haag Centraal and Eindhoven, which makes use of the high-speed line between Rotterdam and Breda, and requires Bombardier Traxx-hauled carriages. When a line is not served by Sprinters, Intercity trains stop at all stations. This takes place on the lines between Alkmaar - Den Helder, Bergen op Zoom - Vlissingen, Hoorn - Enkhuizen, Leiden - Woerden, and Deurne - Venlo. See also Intercity services in the Netherlands and List of Dutch Intercity stations .
 The Intercity Direct service, which offers faster service between Amsterdam Centraal and Breda as it makes use of the high-speed line HSL-Zuid and calls at only two intermediate stations (Schiphol Airport and Rotterdam Centraal). Unlike other Intercity trains, the Intercity Direct requires payment of a supplement on top of the regular fare (€2.60 if bought online and swiping on the platform during peak hours and €1,56 when swiping during off-peak hours) if a passenger's journey involves the high-speed line between Schiphol Airport and Rotterdam Centraal. A regular Intercity service that is free of supplements is still offered.

There are also two former train categories, which are now used only by private operators:
 Stoptrein: This is the original name for Sprinter trains. Between 2003 and 2013 NS discharged the Stoptrein formula in favour of Sprinter. Private operators do not use Sprinter so all private services in the Netherlands (except the four Sneltreins of Arriva, see below) are Stoptrein.
 Sneltrein: Sneltrein (in the English section of the old paper time tables, they were translated as "semi fast train" and were a class between Stoptrain and Intercity) was abandoned by NS in 2008. The NS Sneltrein services are now called Intercity, but they stop more often than "real" Intercities. The result is that some stations (like Woerden) are served by some Intercities while others pass it. As of 2015, there are four Sneltrein services by Arriva.

Fares and tickets 

The OV-chipkaart is the common form of fare payment. Single or return tickets, used by incidental travellers and tourists, are available at ticket machines and service counters at a surcharge of €1. They are a disposable use-once only. It is possible to buy e-tickets online on the Dutch Railways website. E-tickets can also be purchased on the Belgian NMBS/SNCB B-Europe website. For long-term use, season tickets are available.

Travelling with these cards and tickets, one has to register starting a journey (check-in) and ending it (check out) at the destination. One always has to travel away from the point of one's latest check-in. Thus, in the case of a voluntary detour, one has to check out and check in to register starting a new journey.

Travellers need to be aware of the various companies other than the Nederlandse Spoorwegen. One needs to check out with one company and check in with another on some stations. There is common tariff system with four smaller passenger train operating companies: Keolis Nederland and Connexxion in the centre and the east, Veolia on the 'Maaslijn' and 'Heuvellandlijn' in the southeast, Arriva in the north and most of the east of the country and on the 'Merwede-Lingelijn' (from Dordrecht to Geldermalsen).

The OV-chipkaart is also used on buses and trams, where hourly tickets are for sale for those who have too little credit to travel but enough cash.

Off-peak discount passes 
NS defines off-peak hours as weekdays from 09:00-16:00 and 18:30-06:30, and on Saturdays and Sundays the whole day. Therefore, the full fare is required on weekdays 06:30-09:00 and 16:00-18:30. With an OV-chipkaart that allows for a discount or free travel, one is automatically granted the discount or free travel at the time of checking in. There are several season tickets available that suit individual preferences.

Logo

The NS corporate logo was designed in 1968 by Gert Dumbar and Gert-Jan Leuvelink, both of the graphic design company Tel Design. Introduced in that same year, it replaced an earlier design which had been used since 1946. The logo, pervasive within trains and railway stations in the Netherlands, plays a significant part in Nederlandse Spoorwegen's signage, promotions, advertising, and graphic design.

The logo usually appears in blue or black on a dark yellow or white background. Since its introduction, NS livery has also had this same distinct dark yellow or white colour. The logo is a widened letter 'N' and a sideways (reversed) 'S'-shape.  The two arrows in the logo represent the train's movement, and the two lines in the middle represent the track.

Divisions of NS

Abellio is the subsidiary for operations outside the Netherlands. Abellio has won several franchises in the United Kingdom and Germany.

In 2003, Abellio commenced operating its first rail franchise in the United Kingdom, through its 50% shareholding in Serco-Abellio. From 2004 until 2016, Serco-Abellio also operated the Northern Rail franchise. In May 2009, the Travel London and Travel Surrey bus businesses were purchased from National Express and rebranded as Abellio London and Abellio Surrey.

In February 2012, Abellio Greater Anglia commenced operating the Greater Anglia franchise, and in April 2015, Abellio ScotRail commenced operating the ScotRail franchise. In 2016, Abellio successfully bid to retain the renamed East Anglia franchise until 2025. Abellio has partnered with Mitsui for both the East Anglia and the West Midlands franchises, the latter also with JR East. In June 2019 Abellio began operating the East Midlands Railway eight-year franchise.

NS Reizigers (NSR) - NS Travellers, responsible for passenger train services and for employing train drivers and conductors.
NS Stations - the result of merging the former :
NS Stations - in charge of the operation of all 404 railway stations in the Netherlands, i.e., also those served by other railway companies than NS Reizigers; see also station facilities.
NS Vastgoed - owns 48 km2 of land, often near stations, and develops and operates these areas as public traffic nodes, offices and apartments.
NedTrain - train maintenance.
NS Commercie - product- and customer management (business and product development, marketing, sales and customer service).
NS International - operator, in conjunction with NS Reizigers and foreign partners, of Thalys (from Amsterdam to Paris), ICE (to Cologne and Frankfurt), Intercities (to Berlin) and Intercity Direct services (to Brussels via the HSL-Zuid) and the ÖBB Nightjet (to Vienna and Innsbruck).

In dealing with the general public, these distinctions are not made and the terms Nederlandse Spoorwegen and NS are used.

NS has contracts with Connexxion and BBA, now Veolia Transport for the provision of bus services to replace train services in the case of planned and unplanned cancellations.

On 23 July 2010 NS sold Strukton to the construction company Oranjewoud N.V.. This concluded a long history of planning, designing and executing track development done by the NS.

Policy
There is a delay refund scheme entitling passengers to a partial or full refund of the ticket price if a journey is delayed by half an hour or more. The scheme does not apply on short-distance journeys (tickets less than €2.30) and cases in which the delay is the result of planned cancellations that were announced some days in advance. Refunds are, in general, half the ticket price of a one-way trip after a delay of over 30 minutes, and the full ticket price after a delay of one hour or more. That applies to nearly all kinds of tickets. The refund is not considered monetary compensation for lost time but rather as a reduction in charges where poor service has been provided. The system has been improved for holders of some rail passes. Part of the cost of the scheme is paid by ProRail, since they are responsible for part of the delays.

Tobacco smoking is prohibited both on trains and in stations. Smoking on trains has been prohibited since 2004, with smoking in stations permitted in designated smoking zones, until this too was disallowed in October 2020. 

Since June 2003, the sale of coffee, soft drinks, beer, sandwiches, candy, etc., has ceased aboard domestic trains. The increasing number of Servex convenience stores at railway stations and the relatively short duration of most train journeys in the Netherlands have lowered the demand for on-train services. In 2005, a much reduced in-train service of drinks and small snacks has been reintroduced on longer journeys. Now, the RailTender service primarily operates in the intercity trains on the trajectory between Utrecht and Zwolle/Eindhoven, Zwolle and Almere, 's-Hertogenbosch and Nijmegen, Apeldoorn and Amersfoort, Rotterdam and Breda/Roosendaal/Antwerp.

Technological assistance for train staff
Conductors have a smartphone with a timetable, fares information, and a separate card reader to read the OV-chipkaart.
Train drivers use a tablet with an app called "TimTim" to save energy and keep up with the timetable. The train driver can also see other trains that are in front or behind his train.

Statistics
14.73 billion passenger km per year (2005), which is 30% of the seat km.

In 2018, NS saw its number of passengers increase by nearly 3 percent. On average, 1.3 million people took the train on a weekday, 100.000 more than in 2016 and the over 250 NS train stations are becoming increasingly crowded.{{

The top 15 busiest train stations in the Netherlands by travelers (NS only) per working day in 2019:

Also see List of busiest railway stations in The Netherlands

See also

 Dutch railway services
 NS Timetable 2010
 Rail transport by country
 Rail transport in the Netherlands
 Railway stations in the Netherlands
 Train categories in Europe
 Train routes in the Netherlands
 Trains in the Netherlands
 Transport in the Netherlands

References

Further reading

External links
 
 Nederlandse Spoorwegen, English website

 
Dutch brands
Government-owned companies of the Netherlands
Rail transport in the Netherlands
Railway companies of the Netherlands
Railway companies established in 1938
Dutch companies established in 1938
Organisations based in Utrecht (city)
Companies based in Utrecht (province)
Rail transport in Utrecht (city)